Silver Valley is a 1927 American silent Western film directed by Benjamin Stoloff and written by Harold B. Lipsitz and Malcolm Stuart Boylan. The film stars Tom Mix, Dorothy Dwan, Philo McCullough, Jocky Hoefli, Tom Kennedy, and Lon Poff. The film was released on October 2, 1927, by Fox Film Corporation.

Cast    
 Tom Mix as Tom Tracey
 Dorothy Dwan as Sheila Blaine
 Philo McCullough as 'Black Jack' Lundy
 Jocky Hoefli as The Silent Kid
 Tom Kennedy as 'Hayfever' Hawkins
 Lon Poff as 'Slim' Snitzer
 Harry Dunkinson as Mike McCool
 Clark Comstock as 'Wash' Taylor

References

External links
 
 

1927 films
1927 Western (genre) films
Fox Film films
Films directed by Benjamin Stoloff
American black-and-white films
Silent American Western (genre) films
1920s English-language films
1920s American films